Natada arizana is a moth in the family Limacodidae. It is found in Taiwan.

References

Moths described in 1916
Limacodidae
Moths of Taiwan